Mancelona is a village in the Northern Lower Peninsula of the U.S. state of Michigan. Part of Mancelona Township, the village is located within Antrim County. Its population was 1,344 at the 2020 census.

History 
In 1869, Perry Andress established a homestead in the area, naming it after his daughter, Mancelona Andress. Two years later, the Township of Mancelona was established, and named after her as well. In 1872, an extension of the Grand Rapids and Indiana Railroad was extended through the area, and a station called Mancelona was established.

In 1882, an organization by the name of "John Otis & Company" built a large charcoal furnace just south of Mancelona. The company also platted a town around the furnace, naming it "Furnaceville". Soon after this, the Grand Rapids and Indiana Railroad built a station at that town. The furnace flourished, and in 1886 a group of businessmen from Grand Rapids bought out the company, and renamed the company Antrim Iron Works and the town Antrim. A large blast furnace and iron works was built on the site, and the new company began doing business. The iron company shuttered in 1945, and was demolished in the 1980s.

Geography

Mancelona is known for its proximity to the bodies of water that make up the Elk River Chain of Lakes Watershed, especially Torch Lake.

Demographics

2010 census
As of the census of 2010, there were 1,390 people, 518 households, and 349 families residing in the village. The racial makeup of the village was 95.1% White, 1.1% Native American, and 3.7% from two or more races. Hispanic or Latino people of any race were 0.9% of the population.

There were 518 households, of which 40.2% had children under the age of 18 living with them, 40.9% were married couples living together, 19.3% had a female householder, 7.1% had a male householder, and 32.6% were other-families. 25.9% of all households were made up of individuals, and 10.4% had someone living alone who was 65 years of age or older. The average household size was 2.68 and the average family size was 3.19.

The median age in the village was 34.1 years. 29.6% of residents were under the age of 18; 10.2% were between the ages of 18 and 24; 24.9% were from 25 to 44; 23.2% were from 45 to 64; and 12.1% were 65 years of age or older. The gender makeup of the village was 47.3% male and 52.7% female.

2000 census
As of the census of 2000, there were 1,408 people, 535 households, and 367 families residing in the village. The racial makeup of the village was 95.60% White, 0.36% African American, 1.35% Native American, 0.07% Asian, 0.71% from other races, and 1.92% from two or more races. Hispanic or Latino of any race were 2.20% of the population.

There were 535 households, out of which 36.1% had children under the age of 18 living with them, 46.7% were married couples living together, 15.1% had a female householder with no husband present, and 31.4% were non-families. 25.6% of all households were made up of individuals, and 13.8% had someone living alone who was 65 years of age or older.  The average household size was 2.62 and the average family size was 3.07.

In the village, the population was spread out, with 28.9% under the age of 18, 9.9% from 18 to 24, 28.2% from 25 to 44, 21.2% from 45 to 64, and 11.8% who were 65 years of age or older.  The median age was 33 years. For every 100 females, there were 89.0 males.  For every 100 females age 18 and over, there were 87.1 males.

The median income for a household in the village was $29,583, and the median income for a family was $32,375. Males had a median income of $25,313 versus $18,917 for females.

Education
Mancelona Public Schools operates public schools. Mancelona teams are known as the "Ironmen".

Major highways
 traverses the town southwest to northeast. Northeast of Mancelona, the highway continues through the towns of Alba, Boyne Falls, and Walloon Lake, before ending at US 31 in downtown Petoskey. To the southwest, US 131 runs through Kalkaska and Fife Lake before turning due south and converting to a freeway, continuing south toward Cadillac, Grand Rapids, and Kalamazoo.
 is another north–south highway running through Mancelona. To the north, M-66 runs through East Jordan before terminating at Charlevoix. To the south, M-66 runs with US 131 to Kalkaska, but continues south to the east of US 131, running through smaller communities like Lake City, Marion, and eventually, Ionia and Sturgis.
 is an east–west highway that has its eastern terminus in downtown Mancelona. M-88 is entirely within Antrim County, running through the communities of Bellaire and Central Lake before terminating at US 31 in Eastport.
 is an east–west county-designated highway that serves as an eastward extension of M-88. East of Mancelona, C-38 enters Otsego County.

References

Villages in Antrim County, Michigan
Villages in Michigan
Populated places established in 1889
1889 establishments in Michigan